Michael Sayers (19 December 1911 – 2 May 2010) was an Irish poet, playwright, and writer whose books co-authored with Albert E. Kahn made him a target of US blacklisting during the McCarthyism era of the 1950s.

Background

Michael Sayers was born on December 19, 1911, in Dublin, Ireland, one of four children.  His parents, Philip Sayers and Molly Harmel, were Jewish Lithuanians; his father, strongly committed to Irish Republicanism, was a friend of Michael Collins.  Sayers went to school in Dublin and briefly at Cheltenham College in England.  He studied briefly at London University and at Trinity College Dublin.  At Trinity, he studied French under Samuel Beckett. At Michael MacLiammoir's Gate Theatre, he interacted with actors like Orson Welles and James Mason. He published poetry and wrote for the theater magazine Motley as well as College Miscellanyas.

Career

In the 1930s, age 18, Sayers first worked for T. S. Eliot, who made him a theater reviewer for The Criterion.    A.R. Orage gave him the same role for The New English Weekly.  Through A.R. Orage, Sayers wound up sharing a flat with fellow writers Rayner Heppenstall and Eric Blair ("George Orwell").  Sayers published stories in Edward J. O'Brien's annual Best British Short Stories.

In 1936, Sayers moved to New York City as dramaturge for Norman Bel Geddes.   In 1939, Sayers worked for Friday (magazine)  and investigated pro-Nazi activities (e.g., Henry Ford) in the United States.  By 1942, he was working with Kahn for The Hour newsletter, also investigating Nazis.  Together, Sayers and Kahn wrote three books: Sabotage!: The Secret War Against America (1942), The Plot Against the Peace: A Warning to the Nation! (1945), and The Great Conspiracy (1946).  Sayers claimed he was the first journalist to report on the newly liberated Nazi death camps – stories his Fortune (magazine) editor rejected the story as unbelievable.

In March 1944, Sayers published a four-part series of articles entitled "Rise of Anti-Semitic Fifth Column in Eire" in PM newspaper.  The title of one article was "Truth About Nazi Espionage in Eire:  Irish Terrorists Work Directly Under Hitler's Order."  The Irish consul general in New York City and the government in Ireland exchanged worried messages.  The Jewish Representative Council of Ireland became involved and had 14 representatives sign a document that declared, "No Irish Government has ever discriminated between Jew and Non-Jew."  Fianna Fáil T.D. Robert Briscoe, Jewish, wrote to the same effect.  Their statements appeared in Irish and Catholic newspapers in the USA.  On March 25, 1944, PM responded, denying it had imputed the current Irish government but also asserting that anti-Semitism did exist in Ireland and that some people there supported the Nazis, e.g., the Irish Fascist Party.  Later, documentary evidence showed that pro-Nazi, anti-Semitic sentiments did exist among some people in Ireland.  Also, the German embassy did foster such sentiments.  Further, there were connections between Father Charles Coughlin and the Christian Front in the USA and a Father Denis Fahey of the Kimmage Manor seminary in Ireland.  Exacerbating the cross-Atlantic concerns was the fact that, in February 1944, the Irish government had published the contents of an "American Crisis Note," in which US Secretary of State Cordell Hull asked Ireland to expel German and Japanese government representatives.

In mid-1945, Sayers returned to London, where he saw Orwell, who had just published Animal Farm.  In the later 1940s, Sayers helped inaugurate live television by writing plays for NBC for stars like Rex Harrison and Boris Karloff.

In the 1950s, Sayers was blacklisted because of his left-wing sympathies. The renewal of his US passport was threatened. He reclaimed Irish citizenship and was helped to get an Irish passport by Irish writer and diplomat Conor Cruise O'Brien.  Sayers seemed to escape anti-Communist efforts in theater (e.g., Maria Duce's Catholic Cinema and Theatre Patrons Association) when his play Kathleen ("a light romantic comedy") debuted in Dublin in the mid-1950s.   In the 1950s he lived in France and, under the pseudonym "Michael Connor" he wrote plays for BBC television's Armchair Theatre.  He also wrote drama series such as The Adventures of Robin Hood, William Tell, and Ivanhoe. He introduced Joseph Losey to Dirk Bogarde; Bogarde appeared in Losey films, e.g., The Servant and Accident.

In the 1960s, Sayers worked for Charles K. Feldmanon the screenplays of Zorba the Greek and Hair., and wrote the final version of the screenplay of the James Bond film Casino Royale
In the 1980s, Sayers moved to New York City to stay and spent the rest of his life writing poems and plays and teaching screenwriting until shortly before his death.

Personal life and death

In 1938, Sayers married Mentana Galleani, daughter of the militant Italian anarchist Luigi Galleani (whose followers included Sacco and Vanzetti). They had two sons.  In 1955, they divorced.  In 1957, Sayers married Sylvia Thumin (who died in 2006. and he adopted her son.

Sayers died age 98 on May 2, 2010, in New York.

Legacy

At his death, the UK's Independent wrote of him:  "Sayers had a sharp political intelligence and spoke of his persecution in America with realism and resignation. He was a gentle, humorous man, who, like many gifted writers of his generation, paid the price for having the wrong opinions at the wrong time in the wrong place, and whose career never quite recovered from the set-back."

Works

Books written with Alfred E. Kahn
 Sabotage! The Secret War Against America (1942, 1944)
 Taĭnai︠a︡ voĭna protiv Ameriki (1947)
 The Plot Against the Peace: A Warning to the Nation! (1945)
 The Great Conspiracy: The Secret War Against Soviet Russia (1946)
 Gran conspiración contra Rusia (1946, 1948)
 Grote samenzwering (1946)
 Groyse farshverung (1946)
 Gran conspiración contra Rusia (1948)
 Grande congiura (1948)
 Wielki spisek przeciwko ZSRR (1948)
 Velké spiknutí (1950)
 Tālāqu śérā (1981)
Articles
 "Japan's Undercover Drive in America," Friday (February 14, 1941)
Plays
 Kathleen (1955)
 Electra: the Legend (1997) 
 The Neutrals (1998) 
 Joan Saint Joan (1991)
 Screenplays
 Casino Royale (1967 film)
 Teleplays
 Der Spazierstock (1955)

See also

 Albert E. Kahn
 T. S. Eliot
 George Orwell

References

External links
 Archive of Michael Sayers
 Blacklisted! The Life and Extraordinary Times of Irish-Born Jewish Writer, Michael Sayers
 Sean Sayers
Katrina Goldstone, Irish Writers and the Thirties: Art, Exile and War. Routledge, 2021

1911 births
2010 deaths
20th-century American dramatists and playwrights
20th-century American male writers
20th-century American poets
20th-century American writers
20th-century Irish poets
Alumni of Trinity College Dublin
American investigative journalists
American male dramatists and playwrights
American male journalists
American male poets
American political writers
Irish Jews
Irish emigrants to the United States
Irish socialists
Irish writers
Jewish American writers
Jewish socialists
Victims of McCarthyism